San Giovanni Suergiu, Santu Giuanni de Suergiu in sardinian language,  is a comune (municipality) in the Province of South Sardinia in the Italian region Sardinia, located about  west of Cagliari and about  south of Carbonia.

San Giovanni Suergiu borders the following municipalities: Carbonia, Giba, Portoscuso, Sant'Antioco, Tratalias.

Main sights

Church of St. Mary of Palmas, in Pisan-Romanesque style (12th century)
Church of St. John the Baptist (14th century)
Remains of the Castle of Palmas (11th century)
Necropolis of Is Locci-Santus, belonging to the Ozieri culture and including 13 domus de janas
Several nuraghe and the giants' grave of Craminalana
Natural preserve of Punt'e Trettu

References

Cities and towns in Sardinia